Kamōš-ʿaśa is mentioned in Assyrian sources as a king of Moab during the reign of Assurbanipal, who was king of the Neo-Assyrian Empire between 669–631 BCE.

References

Sources

 
 
 
 

Moab